Kali is a genus of snaketooth fishes, deep ocean fish from the family Chiasmodontidae.

Etymology 
The genus is named after the Hindu goddess of time, change and destruction, Kali.

Species
There are currently seven recognized species in this genus:

 Kali colubrina M. R. S. de Melo, 2008
 Kali falx M. R. S. de Melo, 2008
 Kali indica Lloyd, 1909
 Kali kerberti (M. C. W. Weber, 1913)
 Kali macrodon (Norman, 1929)
 Kali macrura (A. E. Parr, 1933)
 Kali parri R. K. Johnson & Cohen, 1974

References

Chiasmodontidae
Marine fish genera